EN 50155:2017 is a regional standard covering electronic equipment used on rolling stock for railway applications. The standard covers aspects of this electronic equipment, including temperature, humidity, shock, vibration, and other parameters. A copy of the standard may be purchased from authorised standards agencies, e.g. BSI in the UK.

References

External links

50155